Ahrensfelde is a municipality in the district of Barnim, in Brandenburg, Germany. The municipal area comprises the villages of Ahrensfelde, Blumberg, Eiche, Lindenberg, and Mehrow.

History

Ahrensfelde, like the neighbouring village of Eiche, was first mentioned in the 1375 Landbuch (domesday book) survey executed for Emperor Charles IV, after he had acquired the Margraviate of Brandenburg two years before. The oldest village however is Blumberg, once a possession held by the Bishops of Brandenburg, which was first mentioned as Blumenberch in 1253. Blumberg manor was acquired by the poet and diplomat Friedrich von Canitz in the late 17th century, the castle was later rebuilt according to plans by Karl Friedrich Schinkel with a park designed by Peter Joseph Lenné. It was destroyed by the advancing Red Army during the 1945 Battle of Berlin. The art historian Adolf Bötticher was a native of Blumberg.

In 1908 the Ahrensfelde Cemetery was established by the Evangelical Church of the Prussian Union as a multi-regional burial site outside of Berlin. Parts of the municipal area near Ahrensfelde station were overbuilt and finally incorporated into the East Berlin borough of Marzahn in 1990. The present-day municipality was established by the merger of Ahrensfelde proper with Blumberg, Eiche and Lindeberg on 26 October 2003.

Demography

Politics

Seats in the municipal assembly (Gemeindevertretung) as of the 2008 local election:
Free Voters: 6
Christian Democratic Union: 5
The Left: 4
Social Democratic Party of Germany: 3
"Citizens' Association Eiche": 2
Free Democratic Party: 1
"The Independent": 1

References

Localities in Barnim